The Chrysalis School was an independent school for autistic children in Hertfordshire, England. The school moved to Hitchin before closing in 2011. It used the model of Applied Behaviour Analysis (ABA) to facilitate teaching its pupils.

The school's aim was to start working with young children who had just been diagnosed as autistic, or those who had been following a home-based ABA programme. It was set up by two families who have autistic children.

With the backing of the Local Education Authority, plus fundraising and grants, the school provided places for children between five and sixteen years of age. The school was a registered charity.

Fundraising events
The school regularly organised a variety of public events to raise funds. These included sports events; balls; musicals, such as a performance of the 'Twelfth Night' in 2008; and murder mystery nights.

See also
TreeHouse

References

External links 
 Chrysalis School for Autism

Schools for people on the autistic spectrum
Defunct schools in Hertfordshire
Educational institutions disestablished in 2011
2011 disestablishments in England
Autism-related organisations in the United Kingdom
Defunct special schools in England